"(This Thing Called) Wantin' and Havin' It All" is a song written by Dave Loggins and Ronnie Samoset, and recorded by American country music group Sawyer Brown. It was released in July 1995 as the lead single from the album This Thing Called Wantin' and Havin' It All.  The song reached number 11 on the Billboard Hot Country Singles & Tracks chart.

Chart performance
"(This Thing Called) Wantin' and Havin' It All" debuted at number 57 on the U.S. Billboard Hot Country Singles & Tracks for the week of July 22, 1995.

Year-end charts

References

1995 singles
1995 songs
Sawyer Brown songs
Songs written by Dave Loggins
Music videos directed by Michael Salomon
Curb Records singles
Songs written by Ronnie Samoset